The JoAnn Falletta International Guitar Concerto Competition is a competition for classical guitarists from all over the world. The competition was launched in 2004 by PBS member stations WNED-FM, WNED-TV and the Buffalo Philharmonic Orchestra (BPO). It was named in honor of the BPO's music director, JoAnn Falletta. It was the world’s first concerto competition for classical guitarists with accompaniment by a full symphony orchestra. The art directors are Joanne Castellani and Michael Andriaccio (Castellani-Andriaccio Duo) and Donald K. Boswell (President and CEO, Western New York Public Broadcasting).

To date there have been only three absolute winners of the competition who won all possible awards (1st Prize, Musicians Favorite Award, and Audience Favorite Award): 2004:  Marcin Dylla (Poland), 2014:  Marko Topchii (Ukraine) and 2016:  Anton Baranov (Russia).

Rules
 The competition has occurred every two years since 2004, always in the city of Buffalo, New York.
 The participants have to play required pieces and freely chosen pieces from memory.
 The finals of the competition are taking place in the Kleinhans Music Hall, a National Historic Landmark with exquisite acoustics and a large seating capacity of 2,839. It is the largest known concert hall that hosted the final of the classical guitar competition.
 In addition to the 1st, 2nd, and 3rd places there are three special awards: Audience Favorite Award and Musicians Favorite Award. While the Audience Favorite is a quite common award in the public music competitions, the Musicians Favorite Award is representing the professional recognition of the orchestra member musicians. The William and Carol Greiner Award, new for 2018, is awarded to the competitor(s) advancing to the final round with a recently composed, lesser-known work from the repertoire list.

Winners

2018
1. Prize:  Bokyung Byun (South Korea)
2. Prize:  Tengyue Zhang (China)
3. Prize:  Congyi Zhang (China)
Musicians Favorite Award (Special prize):  Bokyung Byun (South Korea)
Audience Favorite Award (Special prize):  Tengyue Zhang (China)
William and Carol Greiner Award (Special prize):  Congyi Zhang (China)
2016
1. Prize:  Anton Baranov (Russia)
2. Prize:  Andras Csaki (Hungary)
3. Prize:  Alec Holcomb (USA)
Musicians Favorite Award (Special prize):  Anton Baranov (Russia)
Audience Favorite Award (Special prize):  Anton Baranov (Russia)
2014 
1. Prize:  Marko Topchii (Ukraine)
2. Prize:  Ekachai Jearakul (Thailand)
3. Prize:  Chad Ibison (USA)
Musicians Favorite Award (Special prize):  Marko Topchii (Ukraine)
Audience Favorite Award (Special prize):  Marko Topchii (Ukraine)
2012 
1. Prize:  Celil Kaya (Turkey)
2. Prize:  Petrit Çeku (Croatia)
3. Prize:  Ekachai Jearakul (Thailand)
Musicians Favorite Award (Special prize):  Petrit Çeku (Croatia)
Audience Favorite Award (Special prize):  Petrit Çeku (Croatia)
2010 
1. Prize:  Artyom Dervoed (Russia)
2. Prize:  Nemanja Ostojic (Serbia)
3. Prize:  Thomas Viloteau (France)
Musicians Favorite Award (Special prize):  Thomas Viloteau (France)
Audience Favorite Award (Special prize):  Artyom Dervoed (Russia)
2008 
1. Prize:  Marco Sartor (Uruguay)
2. Prize:  Laura Klemke (Germany)
3. Prize:  Benjamin Beirs (USA)
Musicians Favorite Award (Special prize):  Laura Klemke (Germany)
Audience Favorite Award (Special prize):  Marco Sartor (Uruguay)
2006  
1. Prize:  Pablo Garibay (Mexico)
2. Prize:  Masao Tanibe (Japan)
3. Prize:  Isaac Bustos (USA)
Musicians Favorite Award (Special prize):  Pablo Garibay (Mexico)
Audience Favorite Award (Special prize):  Masao Tanibe (Japan)
2004 
1. Prize:  Marcin Dylla (Poland)
2. Prize:  Pablo Garibay (Mexico)
3. Prize:  Rene Izquierdo (Cuba)
Musicians Favorite Award (Special prize):  Marcin Dylla (Poland)
Audience Favorite Award (Special prize):  Marcin Dylla (Poland)

Jury
2018
 Irina Kulikova (Russia)
 Francisco Bernier (Spain)
 Eric Sessler (USA)
 Michael Newman (USA)
 Sean Samimi (USA)
 Michael Andriaccio (USA)
 Joanne Castellani (USA)
2016
 Antigoni Goni (Greece)
 Jeffrey McFadden (Canada)
 Donald Crockett (USA)
 Mark Delpriora (USA)
 Jeff Cogan (USA)
 Michael Andriaccio (USA)
 Joanne Castellani (USA)
2014
 Ana Vidović (Croatia)
 Micaela Pittaluga (Italy)
 Dale Kavanagh (Canada)
 Thomas Kirchhoff (Germany)
 David Osenberg (USA)
 Michael Andriaccio (USA)
 Joanne Castellani (USA)
2012
 Berta Rojas (Paraguay)
 Eduardo Fernández (Uruguay)
 Ricardo Iznaola (Venezuela)
 Adam Holzman (USA)
 Tony Morris (USA)
 Michael Andriaccio (USA)
 Joanne Castellani (USA)
2010
 Ernesto Cordero (Puerto Rico)
 Micaela Pittaluga (Italy)
 Ernesto Bitetti (Argentina)
 Michael Colina (USA)
 Laura Oltman (USA)
 Michael Andriaccio (USA)
 Joanne Castellani (USA)
2008
 Eduardo Fernandez (Uruguay)
 Enrique Muñoz Teruel (Spain)
 Brian Head (USA)
 David Leisner (USA)
 Tony Morris (USA)
 Michael Andriaccio (USA)
 Joanne Castellani (USA)
2006
 Marcin Dylla (Poland)
 Eduardo Pascual Diez (Spain)
  Miguel del Águila (USA)
 David Frost (USA)
 Jeff Cogan (USA)
 John Landis (USA)
 David Dusman (USA)
 Michael Andriaccio (USA)
 Joanne Castellani (USA)
2004
 Jack Behrens (Canada)
 Carlos Bonell (UK)
 Roberto Sierra (USA)
 Bruce Holzman (USA)
 John Landis (USA)
 David Dusman (USA)
 Michael Andriaccio (USA)
 Joanne Castellani (USA)

External links
 Official competition webpage
 Official competition Facebook page
 Official competition Twitter page

References

Classical music awards
Guitar competitions
Classical guitar
Music competitions in the United States
Competitions in the United States